"Les Paradis perdus" ("the lost paradises") is a 1973 French song by Christophe, written by Christophe and Jean Michel Jarre. It reached no.20 on the French charts.

2015 cover version

The 2015 cover version by Christine and the Queens interpolates American rapper Kanye West's 2008 single "Heartless". It was released as a digital download in June 2015 through Because Music as the fourth and final single from his debut studio album Chaleur Humaine (2014).  A music video to accompany the release of "Paradis perdus" was first released onto YouTube on 14 October 2015 at a total length of three minutes and thirty-eight seconds.

Track listing

Charts

Weekly charts

Year-end charts

Release history

References

1973 singles
1973 songs
2015 singles
2015 songs
Christine and the Queens songs
Because Music singles
Christophe (singer) songs
Songs written by Christophe (singer)